Dancing in the Dragon's Jaws is the ninth studio album by Canadian singer-songwriter Bruce Cockburn. The album has eight songs written around the acoustic guitar and "particularly showcased Cockburn's sparkling guitar work". Up to that time Cockburn's records had been influenced by his Christianity; Third Way magazine wrote in 1987 that "in 1979 the simple Christian faith [Cockburn] had been celebrating was transformed with the release of his most popular ever album Dancing in the Dragon's Jaws, where, with the help of Charles Williams, his pre-Christian mysticism resurfaced after the baptism of faith as mature Christian mysticism. The poetry was astonishing, like no Christian musician had then, or would since, come even close to."

The single "Wondering Where the Lions Are" reached No. 21 in the United States, and spent 17 weeks on the Billboard chart. It was important in bringing Cockburn attention outside Canada, and would be his highest-charting single in the U.S.

The album cover is a painting by Canadian aboriginal artist Norval Morrisseau (1932–2007). In 1992 a remastered edition was released by Rounder Records with two extra tracks, "Dawn Music" and "Bye Bye Idi".

Reception

Music critic Brett Hartenbach, writing retrospectively for AllMusic, wrote "The album continues the jazz-inflected folk he had been pursuing on his past several releases, but with a heavier emphasis on the worldbeat rhythms that would play a larger part in his music in the years to come... though it can't match the sheer power of his next few releases, [it] may be his most beautiful record, as well as an excellent culmination of his '70s work."

Track listing

Personnel 
 Bruce Cockburn – guitar, chimes, synthesizer, dulcimer, vocals
 Pat Godfrey – piano, marimba, background vocal on "Wondering Where the Lions Are"
 Robert Boucher – bass
 Bob Di Salle – drums, congas
except on "Wondering Where the Lions Are"
 Larry "Sticky Fingers" Silvera – bass, background vocal
 Ben Bow – drums, güiro, background vocal

References 

1979 albums
Bruce Cockburn albums
Albums produced by Gene Martynec
True North Records albums